Tioga Pass is a mountain pass in the Sierra Nevada mountain range of California. State Route 120 runs through it, and serves as the eastern entry point for Yosemite National Park, at the Tioga Pass Entrance Station. Mount Dana is to the east of the pass, and Gaylor Peak to the west.

Etymology
Tioga Pass is named after Tioga Mine, whose name came from the Tioga River in New York: Tioga is an Iroquois and Mohawk term meaning "where it forks".

Description

The pass is subject to winter closure due to high snowfall, normally from around the end of October until the end of May the following year, though these dates are subject to considerable variation. In heavy snow years, the road has closed in early October, and has remained closed as late as early July. In light snow years, the road may remain open until December and open as early as April.

Tioga Pass is the most direct route from Bishop or Mammoth Lakes, California to Fresno, Merced, and Stockton.

This is on the Great Basin Divide, which demarcates the Great Basin. The latter is the largest area in North America from which waters don't drain towards an ocean.

Recreation 
There are several trailheads into the Yosemite backcountry which begin at Tioga Pass, including the trail to the Gaylor Lakes to the west/northwest, and the trail to the summit of Mount Dana. Dana Meadows is immediately south of the pass alongside the highway, as the pass itself is roughly angled north–south as opposed to east–west. Dana Meadows contains several small lakes.

A popular recreation and camping area exists just north of the summit of the pass at Tioga Lake. It is in the Inyo National Forest. 

Less than 7 miles to the southwest of the pass, inside Yosemite National Park, is Tuolumne Meadows. The Pacific Crest Trail passes through, and it crosses the highway here.

Wildlife
Some of the wildlife in the area include birds of prey, marmots, bobcats, and occasionally bighorn sheep can be seen.

See also 
 Sonora Pass
 List of mountain passes in California
 Tioga Lake
 Tioga Peak

References

External links 

Tioga Pass Road Hiking Trails
Tioga Pass Status from CalTrans

Mountain passes of California
Mountain passes of the Sierra Nevada (United States)
Landforms of Yosemite National Park
Landforms of Mono County, California
Landforms of Tuolumne County, California
Transportation in Mono County, California
Transportation in Tuolumne County, California
Inyo National Forest